Nouh Doungous Mahamat (born 20 March 1982) is a former Chadian professional football player. He made one appearance for the Chad national football team.

See also
 List of Chad international footballers

References

External links
 

1982 births
Living people
Chadian footballers
Chad international footballers
Place of birth missing (living people)
Association football midfielders